Edward Thomas Bigge (19 October 1807 – 3 April 1844) was an English cleric, the first appointee to the revived role of Archdeacon of Lindisfarne.

He was the son of Charles William Bigge, educated at University College, Oxford and ordained in 1834. A Fellow of Merton College, Oxford, he was only an Archdeacon for two years.

References

1807 births
Alumni of University College, Oxford
Fellows of Merton College, Oxford
Archdeacons of Lindisfarne
1844 deaths